Electric Blue is the debut solo album by Erasure frontman Andy Bell, released 3 October 2005 by Sanctuary Records.  The album was released in-between the Erasure albums Nightbird and Union Street.  Bell toured European and American nightclubs to promote the album.

The album features fourteen tracks, co-written and produced throughout 2004 and 2005 with electronic music duo Manhattan Clique, who have worked as remixers for acts such as Moby, The B-52's, Stereophonics, Goldfrapp, Fischerspooner and Erasure.  Electric Blue includes two duets with Claudia Brücken of Propaganda and another with Jake Shears of Scissor Sisters, and encompasses a variety of musical genres, most notably Giorgio Moroder-style disco, electro and house music.  Upon release the album received mixed reviews, although more often than not critics were positive.

The first single, "Crazy", was released on 26 September 2005, and included club remixes from Erasure-partner Vince Clarke, plus Cicada, Manhattan Clique and King Roc.  The second single, "I'll Never Fall in Love Again", was released 29 May 2006 and was remixed by Goetz, Jaded Alliance and Mr. Do. Included with this single is a non-album B-side track "Back Into the Old Routine".

"Crazy" peaked at number 35 on the UK Singles Chart and was a top-3 success on the U.S. Hot Dance Music/Club Play chart.  Electric Blue hit number 119 in the UK and number 12 on Billboard's Top Electronic Albums chart.

Track listing
All songs were written by Bell, Philip Larsen and Chris Smith, except where noted.
"Intro"
"Caught in a Spin"
"Crazy"
"Love Oneself" (Bell, Claudia Brücken, Larsen, Smith)
"I Thought It Was You" (Bell, Larsen, Jake Shears, Smith)
"Electric Blue" (Bell, Larsen, Smith, Conn)
"Jealous"
"Shaking My Soul"
"Runaway"
"I'll Never Fall in Love Again"
"Delicious"
"Fantasy"
"See the Lights Go Out"
"The Rest of Our Lives" (Bell, Gurney, Larsen, Smith)

Chart performance

Singles
 2005 "Crazy" maxi-single - #35 UK, #3 U.S. Dance
 "Crazy" (MHC Stateside Remix)
 "Crazy" (MHC Stateside Dub)
 "Crazy" (MHC Alternative Stateside Remix)
 "Crazy" (Original Radio Edit)
 "Crazy" (Cicada Vocal Remix)
 "Crazy" (King Roc Remix)
 "Crazy" (Vince Clarke Remix)
 "Crazy" (MHC Master Mix)
 "Crazy" (CD-ROM Track: Music Video)

2005 "Crazy" single
 "Crazy" (Radio edit)
 "Little Girl Lies" (Non Album track)

2005 "Crazy" DVD single
 "Crazy" (Video)
 "Crazy" (Acoustic)
 "Names Change" (Non Album Track)

 2006 "I'll Never Fall in Love Again"
 "I'll Never Fall in Love Again" (Album Version)
 "I'll Never Fall in Love Again" (Jaded Alliance Remix)
 "I'll Never Fall in Love Again" (Goetz Extended Remix)
 "I'll Never Fall in Love Again" (Mr. Do's Remix)
 "I'll Never Fall in Love Again" (Goetz Mix Radio Edit)
 "Back Into the Old Routine" (Non Album Track)

2006 "Electric Blue" / "I'll Never Fall in Love Again" remix promo
 "Electric Blue" (MHC Remix)
 "I'll Never Fall in Love Again" (Jaded Alliance Vocal)
 "I'll Never Fall in Love Again" (Goetz Extended Mix)
 "I'll Never Fall in Love Again" (Mr. Do's Vocal Edit)
 "Electric Blue" (Extended Album Version)

Personnel
 Andy Bell – vocals
 Philip Larsen - synthesisers and programming
 Chris Smith - synthesisers and programming
 Claudia Brücken – vocals on two tracks
 Jake Shears – vocals on one track
 Filippo Gaetani – bass on one track
 Adrian Revell – brass on one track
 Winston Rollins – brass on one track
 Martin Shaw – brass on one track

Additional personnel
 Manhattan Clique – production
 Dick Beetham – mastering
 Phyllis Cohen – artwork, body painting
 Michael Conn – string arrangements
 Rob Crane – art direction
 Tim Flach – photography
 Drew Griffiths – mixing
 Bob Kraushaar – mixing
 Ian Remmer – mixing

References

External links
Official Andy Bell site
Official Erasure site

2005 debut albums
Andy Bell (singer) albums
Sanctuary Records albums